Dupleix could refer to one of the following:

People:
Joseph François Dupleix, governor general of the French establishment in India in the 18th century

Naval ships:
 French corvette Dupleix (1861)  (1856–1887) famous for her involvement in the Japanese revolution
 French ship Dupleix, a 7700 tonne armoured cruiser (1897–1919): built in Rochefort and launched on 28 April 1900
French cruiser Dupleix, French heavy cruiser of the Suffren class, launched 9 October 1930
 Dupleix (D 641), the latest Dupleixis a F70 typ anti-submarine frigate

Commercial ships:
 a steamship built at La Ciotat in 1862, which between 1883 and 1888 operated between Sydney and Nouméa, was sold, refurbished and subsequently operated between Australia and New Zealand.
 a three-masted barque (1901–1917) sunk by the German commerce raider Seeadler on 5 March 1917 
 a cargo ship (1914–1942) sunk in the Pacific by a Japanese submarine.

In transport:
 Dupleix (Paris Métro), a station in the 15th arrondissement of Paris